This list is of foreign films set in Portugal.

A
 April in Portugal (1954) — directed by Euan Lloyd, narrated by Trevor Howard and starring Jocelyn Lane

B
 Belle Époque (1992) — directed by Fernando Trueba, starring Penélope Cruz
 Bis ans Ende der Welt (1991) — directed by Wim Wenders, starring William Hurt and Solveig Dommartin
 The Boys from Brazil (1978) — directed by Franklin J. Schaffner, starring Gregory Peck and Laurence Olivier

C
 Christopher Columbus: The Discovery (1992) — directed by John Glen, starring Marlon Brando and Tom Selleck
 Confessions of Felix Krull (1957) — directed by Kurt Hoffmann, starring Horst Buchholz and Lieselotte Pulver

D
 The Dancer Upstairs (2002) — directed by John Malkovich, starring Javier Bardem and Juan Diego Botto

E

F
 Fados (2007) — directed by Carlos Saura, starring Mariza and Carlos do Carmo
 Fräulein Lausbub (1930) — directed by Erich Schönfelder, starring Julius Falkenstein and Dina Gralla

G
 Genealogies of a Crime (1997) — directed by Raúl Ruiz, starring Catherine Deneuve and Michel Piccoli

H
 The Hairy Ape (1944) — directed by Alfred Santell, starring William Bendix and Susan Hayward
 The House of the Spirits (1993) — directed by Bille August, starring Meryl Streep and Jeremy Irons

I
 In the White City (1983) — directed by Alain Tanner, starring Bruno Ganz and Teresa Madruga
 The Invisible Circus (2001) — directed by Adam Brooks, starring Cameron Diaz

J

K

L
 The Last Run (1971) — directed by Richard Fleischer, starring George C. Scott 
 Les Lavandières du Portugal (1957) — directed by Pierre Gaspard-Huit, starring Jean-Claude Pascal, Anne Vernon, Paquita Rico and Darry Cowl. 
 Lisbon (1956) — directed by Ray Milland, starring Ray Milland, Maureen O'Hara and Claude Rains
 Lisbon Story (1994) — directed by Wim Wenders
 The Lovers of Lisbon (1955) — directed by Henri Verneuil, starring Daniel Gélin and Françoise Arnoul

M

N
 The Night in Lisbon (1971) — directed by Zbyněk Brynych, starring Martin Benrath, Vadim Glowna, Erika Pluhar, Horst Frank, Charles Régnier
The Ninth Gate (1999) — directed by Roman Polanski, starring Johnny Depp and Lena Olin

O
On Her Majesty's Secret Service (1969) — directed by Peter R. Hunt, starring George Lazenby and Diana Rigg

P

Q

R
 The Russia House (1990) — directed by Fred Schepisi, starring Sean Connery and Michelle Pfeiffer

S
 The Second Awakening of Christa Klages (1978) — directed by Margarethe von Trotta, starring Tina Engel and Silvia Reize
 Shanghai Surprise (1986) — directed by Jim Goddard, starring Sean Penn and Madonna
 The State of Things (1982) — directed by Wim Wenders, starring Patrick Bauchau and Allen Garfield

T
 Taxi Lisboa (1996) — directed by Wolf Gaudlitz, starring Gerard Saaman and Josefina Lind
 Time Regained (1999) — directed by Raúl Ruiz, starring Catherine Deneuve, Emmanuelle Béart and John Malkovich
 Tombs of the Blind Dead (1971) — directed by Amando de Ossorio, starring Lone Fleming and César Burner
 The Tour Guide of Lisbon (1956) — directed by Hans Deppe, starring Vico Torriani

U

V

W

X

Y
 Young Toscanini (1988) — directed by Franco Zeffirelli, starring Elizabeth Taylor and C. Thomas Howell 

Z

References
 IMDb

Portugal, List of films set in
 
.Set